Method of difference may refer to: 

 The method of finite differences, used in the difference engine
 One of Mill's methods in inductive reasoning
 A mathematical way of finding the value of telescoping sums